Triplofusus giganteus, previously known as Pleuroploca gigantea, common name the Florida horse conch, is a species of extremely large predatory subtropical and tropical sea snail, a marine gastropod mollusc in the family Fasciolariidae, the spindle snails, tulip snails and their allies.

Although known as a horse conch, this is not a true conch, as it is not in the family Strombidae.

With a shell length that can reach 60 cm, this species is the largest gastropod in United States waters, and one of the largest gastropods in the world.

Distribution
This large sea snail is found along the Atlantic coast of the Americas from the U.S. state of North Carolina to the north, to Yucatán in the Gulf of Mexico to the south.

Anatomy
The animal can retract the soft parts entirely into the shell and close it with the operculum. The soft parts are bright orange in color.

Shell description

This species shell length can reach 24 inches (60 cm).

The outline of the shell is somewhat fusiform, with a long siphonal canal, and having up to 10 whorls. Its sculpture present several spiral cords and axial ribs, some of which can form knobs on the whorls' shoulders.

The shell color is bright orange in very young individuals. The shell often becomes greyish white to salmon-orange when adult, with a light tan or dark brown periostracum.

Ecology

Habitat
This species dwells on sand, weed and mud flats from the low intertidal to shallow subtidal zones, in 20 foot (6 m) deep water.

Feeding habits
Triplofusus giganteus is a carnivorous predatory species, and feeds on other large marine gastropods, including the tulip shell (Fasciolaria tulipa), the lightning whelk (Sinistrofulgur perversum), and the queen conch (Lobatus gigas) as well as some Murex species. It may also present cannibalistic behaviour, feeding on smaller conspecific individuals. It has been observed (in an aquarium setting) to eat small hermit crabs of the species Clibanarius vittatus.

Parasites
Parasites of Triplofusus giganteus include trematode Lophotaspis vallei.

Human use

Modern times
The U.S. state of Florida declared it the state seashell in 1969.  The shell is popular with shell collectors partly because of its great size.

Archaeological and anthropological uses
In classic Mayan art, the Horse Conch is shown being utilised in many ways including as paint and ink holders for elite scribes, and also as a bugle or trumpet.

In southern Florida, Native Americans, including the Calusa and Tequesta, used the horse conch to make several types of artifact.  The whole shell, or more commonly only the columella, was attached to a wooden handle and used as a hammer or woodworking tool.  The body whorl was used as a drinking cup.  The columella was also used to make plummets or sinkers.

Memes
In a National Geographic documentary, the narrator poorly pronunciates Conch, making it weird and humorous at the same time. and today it became an internet meme also known as "The bleeping what?"

References

 Rosenberg, G. 1992. Encyclopedia of Seashells. Dorset: New York. 224 pp. page(s): 91
 Rosenberg, G., F. Moretzsohn, and E. F. García. 2009. Gastropoda (Mollusca) of the Gulf of Mexico, Pp. 579–699 in Felder, D.L. and D.K. Camp (eds.), Gulf of Mexico–Origins, Waters, and Biota. Biodiversity. Texas A&M Press, College Station, Texas.
 Snyder M.A., Vermeij G.J. & Lyons W.G. (2012) The genera and biogeography of Fasciolariinae (Gastropoda, Neogastropoda, Fasciolariidae). Basteria 76(1-3): 31-70

Fasciolariidae
Symbols of Florida
Gastropods described in 1825
Taxa named by George Brettingham Sowerby I
Molluscs of the Atlantic Ocean